Lagampalayam is a panchayat village in Gobichettipalayam taluk in Erode District of Tamil Nadu state, India. It is about 32 km from Gobichettipalayam and 67 km from district headquarters Erode. The village is located on the road connecting Gobichettipalayam with Punjai Puliampatti. Lagampalayam has a population of about 1910.

References

Villages in Erode district